Nizki Island (Avayax̂ in Aleut) is an uninhabited island in the Aleutian Islands in the U.S. state of Alaska. Flanked by Shemya to the east and Alaid to the west, three-mile-long (5 km) Nizki is periodically joined to Alaid by a sand spit. Nizki's shoreline is very irregular and is fringed by numerous rocks, reefs, and kelp-marked shoals.

Foxes were introduced to Nizki Island by Russian fur traders in the 19th century. This decimated the population of many bird species on the island. The last fox was removed from Nizki Island in 1976, and now Aleutian Canada Geese (once believed to be extinct), Puffins, and Aleutian Terns are common on the island.

References

External links
Nizki Island Photos Photos from Nizki Island, July 2008
Alaska Science Forum: Aleutian Canada goose comeback continues

Semichi Islands
Uninhabited islands of Alaska
Islands of Alaska
Islands of Unorganized Borough, Alaska